The 2005 World Judo Championships were the 24th edition of the Judo World Championships, and were held in Cairo, Egypt from September 8 to September 12, 2005. Brazilian João Derly was voted as best performance of the championship. On the last day of competition, team events were held, as South Korea won the men's team event and France won the women's.

Medal overview

Men

Women

Medal table

Results overview

Men

60 kg

66 kg

73 kg

81 kg

90 kg

100 kg

+100 kg

Open class

Men's team

Women

48 kg

52 kg

57 kg

63 kg

70 kg

78 kg

+78 kg

Open class

Women's team

References

External links
 

W
World Judo Championships
World Judo Championships
International sports competitions hosted by Egypt
Sports competitions in Cairo
World Judo Championships, 2005